Paul Anthony Durkin (born 15 August 1955) is an English former football referee, who retired in 2004. He comes from the Isle of Portland in Dorset. He works as a referee assessor for the Football Association.

Durkin was England's only referee at the 1998 FIFA World Cup Finals in France, where he refereed one match – the Group B encounter between Italy and Austria. In the same year, he refereed the FA Cup Final between Arsenal and Newcastle United, he was in charge of the 2003 Football League Cup Final between Liverpool and Manchester United.

In 2004, Durkin appeared in ITV gameshow Simply the Best as the referee.

References

External links
Paul Durkin Referee Statistics at soccerbase.com
7 questions with Paul Durkin

1955 births
English football referees
FIFA World Cup referees
1998 FIFA World Cup referees
Sportspeople from Weymouth
Living people
English Football League referees
Premier League referees
FA Cup Final referees